Manda is a genus of spiny-legged rove beetles in the family Staphylinidae. There are at least two described species in Manda.

Species
These two species belong to the genus Manda:
 Manda mandibularis (Gyllenhal, 1827) g
 Manda nearctica Moore, 1964 i c g b
Data sources: i = ITIS, c = Catalogue of Life, g = GBIF, b = Bugguide.net

References

Further reading

External links

 

Oxytelinae
Articles created by Qbugbot
Staphylinidae genera